The 2018–19 Delaware Fightin' Blue Hens women's basketball team represents the University of Delaware during the 2018–19 NCAA Division I women's basketball season. The Fightin' Blue Hens, led by second year head coach Natasha Adair, play their home games at the Bob Carpenter Center and were members of the Colonial Athletic Association (CAA). They finished the season 16–15, 11–7 CAA play to finish in a 3 way tie for third place. They lost in the quarterfinals of the CAA women's tournament to Towson.

Roster

Schedule

|-
!colspan=9 style=| Non-conference regular season

|-
!colspan=9 style=| CAA regular season

|-
!colspan=9 style=| CAA Women's Tournament

See also
2018–19 Delaware Fightin' Blue Hens men's basketball team

References

Delaware Fightin' Blue Hens women's basketball seasons
Delaware
Delaware Fightin' Blue Hens women's basketball
Delaware Fightin' Blue Hens women's basketball